The Amakasu Incident (Amakasu jiken) was the murder of two prominent Japanese anarchists and a young boy by military police, led by Lieutenant Amakasu Masahiko, in September 1923. The victims were Ōsugi Sakae, an informal leader of the Japanese anarchist movement, together with the anarcha-feminist Itō Noe (his wife), and Ōsugi's child nephew.

During the chaos that followed the catastrophic 1923 Great Kantō earthquake, Japanese authorities killed many dissidents and ethnic Koreans in what became known as the Kantō Massacre. Itō, Ōsugi, and his nephew were arrested on 16 September. According to writer and activist Jakucho Setouchi, Itō, Ōsugi, and his 6-year-old nephew were arrested, beaten to death, and thrown into an abandoned well by a squad of military police led by Lieutenant Masahiko Amakasu. According to literary scholar Patricia Morley, Itō and Ōsugi were strangled in their cells. Both accounts agree that both or all of the prisoners were brutally executed without a trial, where convictions and death sentences for the two adults would have been almost guaranteed. These killings, which became known as the Amakasu Incident, sparked widespread anger. The historian John Crump argued that "once again, the most able anarchist of his generation had been murdered," echoing the execution of Kōtoku Shūsui in the High Treason Incident just twelve years prior.

Following nationwide outcry, Amakasu was court-martialed and sentenced to 10 years in prison. When Hirohito became Emperor of Japan three years later, Amakasu was released. He studied in France and became a special agent for the Imperial Japanese Army in Manchuria. When Japan surrendered in August 1945 he killed himself with potassium cyanide.

See also
 Anarchism in Japan
 Toranomon incident
 Kameido incident

References

External links
 甘粕（あまかす）事件 
 日本ペンクラブ 電子文藝館  招待席・主権在民史料 「関東大震災」 (今井 清一)  
 関東大震災と新聞 (池見哲司)  

1923 in Japan
Anarchism in Japan
Anti-anarchism
History of anarchism
Murder in Japan
Political repression in Japan
1923 murders in Japan
1923 Great Kantō earthquake